Heri Bert Bartscht (1919-1996) was a German-born American sculptor and educator. Born in Breslau and trained at the Academy of Fine Arts, Munich, he taught at the University of Dallas for 29 years, where he established the Sculpture Department. According to the Irving Daily News, "His works are done in the traditional materials such as wood, stone, copper, mosaic or welded or forged steel and in the age-old technique or bronze-casting."

References

1919 births
1996 deaths
Artists from Wrocław
Academy of Fine Arts, Munich alumni
German emigrants to the United States
Sculptors from Texas
University of Dallas faculty
20th-century American sculptors